The Abdallah Mosque is a mosque in Havana, La Habana Province, Cuba.

History
The building where the mosque stands today used to be an antique automobile museum. The building was then converted into a mosque and it was opened in 2015 after the government gave the approval in June.

Architecture
The mosque is a 1-story building in a shape of colonial-style box. Its interior wall is decorated with Arabic calligraphy.

See also
 Islam in Cuba

References

2015 establishments in Cuba
Islam in Cuba
Mosques completed in 2015
Mosques in North America
Religious buildings and structures in Havana
21st-century architecture in Cuba